The Nizhnyaya Tunguska (meaning "Lower Tunguska") is a river in Siberia, Russia, that flows through the Irkutsk Oblast and the Krasnoyarsk Krai. The river is a right tributary of the Yenisey joining it at Turukhansk (see Siberian River Routes). Settlements on the river include Tura, Yukti and Simenga. The ice-free period on the Nizhnyaya Tunguska starts in mid-June and ends in the first half of October. The river forms the western limit of the Lena Plateau.

Hydrography
The Nizhnyaya Tunguska is the second largest right tributary of the Yenisey, and joins it near the town of Turukhansk. According to the character of the stream, constitution of the river's valley and its shores, it can be divided into two parts: the first one starts at the source of the river and continues down to the village Preobrazhenskoye and the second section of the river lies downstream of this village in a canyon-like relief.

Upper stream
The speed of flow at rafts reaches  and drops significantly as the river's channel stretches.

This section of river has a meandering channel that closely approaches the Lena, another great Siberian river. All of the upper course of Nizhnyaya Tunguska is within the Irkutsk Oblast.

Lower stream
Downstream of Preobrazhenskoye village the Lower Tunguska flows across the Tunguska Plateau of the Central Siberian Plateau in a narrow and deep valley with high, often rocky shores. The entire landscape here has volcanic origins, the relief alters the flow of Nizhnyaya Tunguska into a westerly direction. The locations with close approaches of crystalline layers create numerous rapids on the river. The most significant of them have names such as: "Sakko", "Vivinskiy", "Uchamsky" and "Bolshoy" (Big). The rapids on the river has relatively high speeds of water flux reaching . In the river's lowest flow, downstream of join with its tributary river Severnaya, Nizhnyaya Tunguska runs between limestone rocks, which steeply rise from the water.

The channel and water flow of the river's lower stream has its own distinguishing features, which can be seen in some places at Nizhnyaya Tunguska, including the following:
 The strips of stones with sizes , which stretch near water along the shore line. This peculiar feature of Arctic stony rivers with the local name "bechevnick" is formed during every period of ice drift and river inundation at spring. At some locations these sorts of pebbles are polished and pressed together to the extent that they create a cobbled road of their own kind.
These slide-slopes have a local name, korga, and create zones of calm backwater downstream.
 The stream in the channel of the Lower Tunguska sometimes forms whirlpools. They originate downstream of cliffs which channels flow to the opposite shore.

Tributaries
The most significant tributaries of Nizhnyaya Tunguska are the rivers entering from the right: Yeyka, Kochechum, Yambukan, Vivi, Tutonchana, Erachimo, and Severnaya. Entering from the left are the Nepa, Bolshaya Yeryoma, Teteya, Ilimpeya, Nidym, Taymura, and Uchami. The most prominent tributary is Kochechum, which joins the main stem from the north near Tura.

On the whole, the right tributaries of Nizhnyaya Tunguska dominate over the left and add more water. Inflows to the Nizhnyaya Tunguska are strongly seasonal.

Hydrology
The value of average water discharge of Nizhnyaya Tunguska gives it eleventh place amongst largest rivers of Russia. The water supply of the river is from melting snow and summer rains. During winter season Nizhnyaya Tunguska contains little water as its basin lies in the region of permafrost and it has no subterranean water sources.

Seventy-three per cent of the entire annual water yield occurs during the spring–summer season. The amplitude of the water-level variations in the lower stream of Nizhnyaya Tunguska is the highest among all notable rivers of Russia. The summer break-up and drifting of ice passes very violently; it leaves traces in the form of torn-apart uprooted trees and polished rocks.

Economy
The channel of Nizhnyaya Tunguska with its tributaries constitutes dense network of rivers and creeks which creates convenient summer pathways through the wide rifted valley of Eastern Siberia. Historically, the river was used as a route for the fur trade, fishery, for transportation of goods and mineral resources. Hunting and fur trade is still a significant part of the local economy.

Shipping
Navigation on the river is difficult because of a number of rifts, rapids and whirlpools. The passage of large ships and barges is possible during the spring inundation, and rainy weather during particular years allows short periods of navigation at the end of summer or the start of autumn. In 1927 the first steamship passed this rapids and it is considered to be the start of modern navigation on the river from Turukhansk to Tura. As of 2010 the shipping routes of Yenisey River Steamship Lines includes the village Kislokan,  from the estuary. Timber rafting is possible throughout entire course of the river.

It was suggested (and some research was done) in 1911 to build a canal joining the Lena and Nizhnyaya Tunguska rivers in the neighbourhood of Kirensk. In the beginning of 20th century the canal project was considered inexpedient due to its complexity and high cost.

Planned damming
Plans to dam the river existed since the early Soviet period. These plans were the subject of criticism by various ecologists.  Construction of the dams also became impossible after disintegration of Soviet Union due to economic reasons. In 2005–10 the interest to this project and the discussion of it revived to some extent. According news media the construction of the Turukhanskaya hydroelectric powerplant would begin as soon as in 2010. Since the precise date is unknown, a more likely start-up is between 2010 and 2020.

The cost of the plant is estimated at $13 billion dollars, which includes costs of electric power lines. The plant will be built and operated by RusHydro in the Krasnoyarsk region, and the electricity will be channeled to European Russia via a  system of power lines.

Notable facts
 The colonisation history of Western Siberia by Russians since 17th and 18th centuries was reflected in various names for the river at different times. At some periods it was called Troitskaya Tunguska, Monastyrskaya Tunguska and Mangaseyan Tunguska (see Mangaseya).
 In literature, the river Nizhnyaya Tunguska is described in the novel Gloomy River by Vyacheslav Shishkov. This writer of the first half of the 20th century visited the river during an expedition in 1911; the name Gloomy River was taken from a Siberian song.
As this river joins Lower Tunguska downstream of hydrological station "Bolshoy Porog" it means that the known average discharge at mouth of Lower Tunguska is significantly underestimated.

References

Rivers of Irkutsk Oblast
Rivers of Krasnoyarsk Krai